Pardillana exempta is a species of grasshopper in the genus Pardillana of the family Acrididae. It was described by Francis Walker in 1870.

Synonyms
Goniaea fuscula Stål, 1878 is a synonym for this species:

References

Acrididae
Insects described in 1870
Taxa named by Francis Walker (entomologist)